The Ohio Derby is an American Thoroughbred horse race held annually in mid-to-late June at Thistledown in North Randall, Ohio.

The Grade III stakes for three-year-olds is run on dirt over a distance of 1 miles.

The race currently offers a purse of $500,000.

Inaugurated in 1876 at Chester Park, a racetrack on Spring Grove Avenue in Cincinnati, Ohio, the race was canceled after the 1883 running. It was revived in 1924 by the Maple Heights Park racetrack with future Hall of Fame inductee and that year's Kentucky Derby winner Black Gold claiming victory. From 1928 thru 1932 the Ohio Derby was hosted by the now defunct Bainbridge Park Race Track in Bainbridge Township, Ohio, built in 1927 by John King and Homer Kline.

Pete D. Anderson, trainer of 2007 winner Delightful Kiss, won this race in 1964 as the jockey on National.

The Ohio Derby was not scheduled to be run in 2009 in order to maintain reasonable purses for area horsemen. However, an announcement was made in August that the Grade II race would run on October 3, 2009 on the Best of Ohio card. This race was downgraded from a graded stakes to a listed stakes in 2014. The race regained graded status in 2017 by The American Graded Stakes Committee of the Thoroughbred Owners and Breeders Association.

As of 2016, this race is run at 1 and 1/8th miles.

Records
Speed record:
 1:47.86 @ 1-1/8 miles:  Skip Away (1996)	
 1:42.80 @ 1-1/16 miles: Gushing Wind (1962)
 2:40.00 @ 1-1/2 miles: McWhirter (1877)
 
Most wins by a jockey:
 2 - Garth Patterson (1976, 1984)
 2 - Pat Day (1980, 1995)
 2 - Jacinto Vásquez (1982, 1990)
 2 - Willie Martinez (1994, 2004)
 2 - Shane Sellers (1998, 2003)
 2 - Mike McCarthy (1999, 2000)

Most wins by a trainer:
 2 - Edward D. Brown (1876, 1881)
 2 - Clarence S. Buxton (1931, 1932)
 2 - Woody Stephens (1955, 1979)
 2 - Richard W. Small (1986, 1999)
 2 - Thomas M. Amoss (2016, 2020)
 2 - Brad H. Cox (2019, 2022)

Most wins by an owner:
 2 - Jerome H. Louchheim (1931, 1932)
 2 - Robert E. Meyerhoff (1986, 1999)

Winners

References

External links
 2007 Ohio Derby at Thistledown racecorse
 The 2009 Ohio Derby article at Thoroughbred Times

Flat horse races for three-year-olds
Horse races in Ohio
Recurring sporting events established in 1876
1876 establishments in Ohio
Sports competitions in Cleveland
Graded stakes races in the United States